Wilfred Andrew Rose (1922–2008) was a Trinidadian and Tobagonian diplomat and politician who served in the Federal Parliament of the West Indies Federation from 1958 to 1962. A member of the People's National Movement, Rose also held several ambassadorial posts, most notably serving as Trinidad and Tobago's Ambassador to the United Kingdom from 1964 until 1968.

Biography 
Rose was born in 1922 in Trinidad and Tobago, which was then a British colony. In the 1956 Trinidad and Tobago general election, Rose ran for the Caroni South constituency of the Legislative Council of Trinidad and Tobago as a member of the People's National Movement; however, he was defeated by an ascendant Simbhoonath Capildeo, receiving just 20% of the vote compared to Capildeo's 62%. In 1958, Rose was elected to the House of Representatives of the West Indies Federation for the St. Anns constituency. While in parliament, Rose served as the Minister of Communications and Works. Rose served in parliament until the Federation's dissolution in 1962.

Later in 1962, Rose was appointed as the first Trinidad and Tobago High Commissioner to Canada, serving until 1964. From 1964 until 1968, he served as the Trinidad and Tobago High Commissioner to the United Kingdom. In 1968, Rose was appointed as the first Ambassador to Brazil, serving until 1970. Rose would later also serve as the head of mission to the European Economic Commission and the United Nations.

Rose died in 2008.

References 

1922 births
2008 deaths
Date of birth missing
Date of death missing
Place of birth missing
Place of death missing
Members of the Federal Parliament of the West Indies Federation
20th-century Trinidad and Tobago politicians
High Commissioners of Trinidad and Tobago to Canada
Ambassadors of Trinidad and Tobago to Brazil
High Commissioners of Trinidad and Tobago to the United Kingdom
Permanent Representatives of Trinidad and Tobago to the United Nations
People's National Movement politicians